Borghesiana is a station of Line C of the Rome Metro. It is located between the Via Casilina and Via Biancavilla, in the Roman district of Borghesiana.

The station used to be part of the Rome-Pantano railway line until the old station was closed in 2008 so as to be transformed into a Metro stop. It re-opened on 9 November 2014.

External links

Rome Metro Line C stations
Railway stations opened in 2014
2014 establishments in Italy
Railway stations in Italy opened in the 21st century